Robert "Bobby" James Voelker (born April 26, 1979) is an American professional mixed martial artist competing in their Welterweight division. A professional competitor since 2006, Voelker has formerly competed for the UFC, Bellator MMA, Strikeforce, M-1 Global, and Titan FC.

Background
Voelker is from Kansas City, Missouri, and attended Shawnee Mission South High School where he competed in football as well as swimming and diving. Voelker also got into many street fights, being charged with battery when he was 18 years old, and began training in boxing and kickboxing late in high school. After graduating high school, Voelker briefly attended college before dropping out and eventually transitioned into a career in professional mixed martial arts.

Mixed martial arts career

Early career
Voelker compiled an undefeated amateur record of 10-0 before making his professional MMA debut in 2006. He competed in events primarily in Iowa and Kansas, amassing a record of 20–7 before signing with Strikeforce.

Strikeforce
Voelker's debut took place on November 20, 2009 at Strikeforce Challengers: Woodley vs. Bears, where he faced off against WEC veteran Erik Apple, defeating Apple via TKO (punches) in the second round.

His second appearance took place at Strikeforce Challengers: Lindland vs. Casey, where he faced heavy-handed up-and-coming striker "Relentless" Roger Bowling. The fight ended in a technical decision in favor of Bowling due to an unintentional eye injury to Bowling.

He was next signed to face Cory Devela, who was on a two-fight slide, on July 23, 2010, at Strikeforce Challengers: del Rosario vs. Mahe. Devela easily took round one, swarming Voelker and turning the fight into a grappling match. The second and third rounds were a lot closer to call, with Devela mostly controlling Voelker in the clinch, but the split decision was awarded to Voelker, who remained in a dominant position for much of the final frames, landing shots from top position.

A rematch with Bowling took place at Strikeforce Challengers: Bowling vs. Voelker. Voelker  won a very one-sided fight via technical knockout in the second round due to punches. Voelker and Bowling fought for a third time at Strikeforce Challengers: Voelker vs. Bowling III to create Strikeforce's first trilogy. Once again, Voelker dominated and out struck Bowling, thus winning the fight via TKO due to a knee in the second round.

Ultimate Fighting Championship
In January 2013, the Strikeforce organization was closed by its parent company Zuffa. A list of fighters scheduled to be brought over to the Ultimate Fighting Championship was released in mid-January and Voelker was included.

For his debut, Voelker faced Patrick Côté, who was making his Welterweight debut, on March 16, 2013 at UFC 158. Despite finishing strong and winning the third round, Voelker was unsuccessful in his debut, losing the back-and-forth fight via unanimous decision.

Voelker was briefly scheduled to face James Head on August 28, 2013 at UFC Fight Night 27.  However, on July 11, it was announced that Voelker was tabbed as a replacement for Siyar Bahadurzada and face Robbie Lawler on July 27, 2013 at UFC on Fox 8. He lost the fight via knockout in the second round.

Voelker faced William Macário on December 28, 2013 at UFC 168. He lost the fight via unanimous decision.

Voelker faced Lance Benoist on June 7, 2014 at UFC Fight Night 42. He lost the back-and-forth fight via unanimous decision, and was subsequently released from the promotion.

Bellator MMA
After racking a 9–1 record on the regional circuit, Voelker signed with Bellator MMA in April 2019. He made his promotional debut against Sabah Homasi at Bellator 250 on October 29, 2020. He lost the fight via flying knee in the second round.

On May 3, 2021, it was announced that Voelker was no longer under contract with Bellator.

Return to regional circuit
After the one-off bout in Bellator, Voelker returned to Shamrock FC facing Josh Weston at Shamrock FC 332 on October 9, 2021. He won the bout via first-round knockout.

Personal life
Aside from his career as a fighter, Voelker works in construction and is also a devout Catholic. During his UFC tenure, Voelker studied at Kansas City Kansas Community College to be a paramedic and eventually graduated.

Championships and accomplishments
Shamrock Fighting Championships
Shamrock FC Welterweight Championship (one time)

Mixed martial arts record

|-
|Win
|align=center|34–14
|Josh Weston
|TKO (punches)
|Shamrock FC 332
|
|align=center|1
|align=center|1:12
|Kansas City, Missouri, United States
|
|-
|Loss
|align=center|33–14
|Sabah Homasi
|KO (flying knee and punches)
|Bellator 250
|
|align=center|2
|align=center|0:20
|Uncasville, Connecticut, United States
|
|-
|  Win
| align=center| 33–13
| Cameron VanCamp
| Decision (unanimous)
| Shamrock FC 317
| 
| align=center| 5
| align=center| 5:00
| Kansas City, Missouri, United States
|
|-
|  Win
| align=center| 32–13
| Darrius Flowers
| TKO (punches)
| Shamrock FC 313
| 
| align=center| 2
| align=center| 2:00
| Kansas City, Missouri, United States
|
|-
|  Win
| align=center| 31–13
| Justin DeMoney
| TKO (submission to punches)
| Shamrock FC 306
| 
| align=center| 2
| align=center| 1:45
| Kansas City, Missouri, United States
|
|-
|  Win
| align=center| 30–13
| Bobby Emmons
| TKO (punches)
| Shamrock FC 302
| 
| align=center| 1
| align=center| 4:16
| Kansas City, Missouri, United States
|
|-
|  Loss
| align=center| 29–13
| Zak Bucia
| Decision (unanimous)
| Shamrock FC 289
| 
| align=center| 3
| align=center| 5:00
| Kansas City, Missouri, United States
|
|-
|  Win
| align=center| 29–12
| Kyle Kurtz
| TKO (punches and elbows)
| Shamrock FC 276
| 
| align=center| 2
| align=center| 1:55
| Kansas City, Missouri, United States
|
|-
|  Win
| align=center| 28–12
| Raymond Gray
| Decision (unanimous)
| Shamrock Promotions: Assault
| 
| align=center| 3
| align=center| 5:00
| Kansas City, Missouri, United States
| 
|-
|  Win
| align=center| 27–12
| Mike Estus
| TKO (punches)
| Shamrock Promotions: Clash
| 
| align=center| 1
| align=center| 1:27
| Kansas City, Missouri, United States
| 
|-
|  Win
| align=center| 26–12
| Justin Gutherie
| TKO (punches)
| Shamrock Promotions: Heavy Artillery
| 
| align=center| 3
| align=center| 3:09
| Kansas City, Missouri, United States
|
|-
|  Win
| align=center| 25–12
| Cedric Marks
| TKO (punches)
| Shamrock Promotions: Onslaught
| 
| align=center| 1
| align=center| 3:32
| Kansas City, Missouri, United States
| 
|-
|  Loss
| align=center| 24–12
| Lance Benoist
| Decision (unanimous)
| UFC Fight Night: Henderson vs. Khabilov
| 
| align=center| 3
| align=center| 5:00
| Albuquerque, New Mexico, United States
| 
|-
|  Loss
| align=center| 24–11
| William Macário
| Decision (unanimous)
| UFC 168
| 
| align=center| 3
| align=center| 5:00
| Las Vegas, Nevada, United States
| 
|-
|  Loss
| align=center| 24–10
| Robbie Lawler
| KO (head kick and punches)
| UFC on Fox: Johnson vs. Moraga
| 
| align=center| 2
| align=center| 0:24
| Seattle, Washington, United States
| 
|-
|  Loss
| align=center| 24–9
| Patrick Côté
| Decision (unanimous)
| UFC 158
| 
| align=center| 3
| align=center| 5:00
| Montreal, Quebec, Canada
| 
|-
|  Win
| align=center| 24–8
| Roger Bowling
| TKO (knee and punches)
| Strikeforce Challengers: Voelker vs. Bowling III
| 
| align=center| 2
| align=center| 2:16
| Las Vegas, Nevada, United States
| 
|-
|  Win
| align=center| 23–8
| Roger Bowling
| TKO (punches)
| Strikeforce Challengers: Bowling vs. Voelker
| 
| align=center| 2
| align=center| 3:58
| Fresno, California, United States
| 
|-
|  Win
| align=center| 22–8
| Cory Devela
| Decision (split)
| Strikeforce Challengers: del Rosario vs. Mahe
| 
| align=center| 3
| align=center| 5:00
| Everett, Washington, United States
| 
|-
|  Loss
| align=center| 21–8
| Roger Bowling
| Technical decision (unanimous)
| Strikeforce Challengers: Lindland vs. Casey
| 
| align=center| 3
| align=center| 1:38
| Portland, Oregon, United States
| 
|-
|  Win
| align=center| 21–7
| Erik Apple
| TKO (punches)
| Strikeforce Challengers: Woodley vs. Bears
| 
| align=center| 2
| align=center| 1:23
| Kansas City, Kansas, United States
| 
|-
|  Loss
| align=center| 20–7
| Brendan Seguin
| Decision (unanimous)
| Titan FC 14
| 
| align=center| 3
| align=center| 5:00
| Kansas City, Kansas, United States
| 
|-
|  Win
| align=center| 20–6
| Thomas Aaron
| TKO (punches)
| Extreme Fight Production
| 
| align=center| 2
| align=center| 1:47
| Kansas City, Kansas, United States
| 
|-
|  Win
| align=center| 19–6
| Dominic Brown
| TKO (punches)
| Titan FC 13
| 
| align=center| 2
| align=center| 1:33
| Kansas City, Kansas, United States
| 
|-
|  Win
| align=center| 18–6
| CJ Fernandes
| TKO (punches)
| X-Treme Fight 1
| 
| align=center| 2
| align=center| 2:41
| Kansas City, Missouri, United States
| 
|-
|  Loss
| align=center| 17–6
| Jacob Volkmann
| Decision (unanimous)
| VFC 25: Primetime
| 
| align=center| 5
| align=center| 5:00
| Council Bluffs, Iowa, United States
| 
|-
|  Win
| align=center| 17–5
| Amir Rahnavardi
| Decision (unanimous)
| M-1 Challenge 8: USA
| 
| align=center| 3
| align=center| 5:00
| Kansas City, Missouri, United States
| 
|-
|  Win
| align=center| 16–5
| Dominic Brown
| TKO (punches)
| VFC 24: Revolution
| 
| align=center| 2
| align=center| N/A
| Council Bluffs, Iowa, United States
| 
|-
|  Win
| align=center| 15–5
| Ryan Braun
| TKO (punches)
| MCC 14: Pride or Fate
| 
| align=center| 2
| align=center| 3:17
| Urbandale, Iowa, United States
| 
|-
|  Loss
| align=center| 14–5
| Kevin Burns
| KO (punch)
| VFC 23: Validation
| 
| align=center| 1
| align=center| 0:30
| Council Bluffs, Iowa, United States
| 
|-
|  Win
| align=center| 14–4
| Nathan Looker
| TKO (submission to punches)
| World Cage Fighting Championships
| 
| align=center| 1
| align=center| 1:34
| Independence, Missouri, United States
| 
|-
|  Loss
| align=center| 13–4
| Joey Gorczynski
| Decision (split)
| Titan FC 11
| 
| align=center| 3
| align=center| N/A
| Kansas City, Missouri, United States
| 
|-
|  Win
| align=center| 13–3
| Matt Delanoit
| TKO (submission to strikes)
| MCC 11: Night of Champions
| 
| align=center| 3
| align=center| 1:43
| Des Moines, Iowa, United States
| 
|-
|  Loss
| align=center| 12–3
| Leonardo Pecanha
| Submission (armbar)
| Titan FC 8
| 
| align=center| 1
| align=center| 1:58
| Kansas City, Kansas, United States
| 
|-
|  Win
| align=center| 12–2
| Danny Anderson
| Decision (unanimous)
| VFC 19: Inferno
| 
| align=center| 3
| align=center| 5:00
| Council Bluffs, Iowa, United States
| 
|-
|  Win
| align=center| 11–2
| Warren Walker
| TKO (punches)
| Titan FC 7
| 
| align=center| 1
| align=center| 1:04
| Kansas City, Kansas, United States
| 
|-
|  Win
| align=center| 10–2
| Victor Moreno
| TKO (punches)
| MCC 7: Valentine's Massacure
| 
| align=center| 2
| align=center| N/A
| Des Moines, Iowa, United States
| 
|-
|  Win
| align=center| 9–2
| Ken Jackson
| TKO (punches)
| Titan FC 6
| 
| align=center| 1
| align=center| 3:08
| Kansas City, Kansas, United States
| 
|-
|  Win
| align=center| 8–2
| Ted Worthington
| Decision (unanimous)
| MCC 6: Hard Hitters
| 
| align=center| 3
| align=center| 5:00
| Urbandale, Iowa, United States
| 
|-
|  Win
| align=center| 7–2
| Jody Lithicum
| TKO (submission to punches)
| World Series of Rumble
| 
| align=center| 1
| align=center| 0:43
| Junction City, Kansas, United States
| 
|-
|  Win
| align=center| 6–2
| Clayton Marrs
| Decision (unanimous)
| Freestyle Cage Fighting
| 
| align=center| 3
| align=center| 3:00
| Tulsa, Oklahoma, United States
| 
|-
|  Win
| align=center| 5–2
| Jack Hodge
| TKO (submssion to punches)
| Titan FC 5
| 
| align=center| 2
| align=center| 0:51
| Kansas City, Kansas, United States
| 
|-
|  Loss
| align=center| 4–2
| Justin Wilcox
| Decision (unanimous)
| Extreme Challenge 68
| 
| align=center| 2
| align=center| 5:00
| Hayward, Wisconsin, United States
| 
|-
|  Win
| align=center| 4–1
| Brian Green
| TKO (punches)
| Titan FC 4
| 
| align=center| 2
| align=center| 1:38
| Kansas City, Kansas, United States
| 
|-
|  Win
| align=center| 3–1
| Johnathan Richmond
| TKO (punches)
| Titan FC 2
| 
| align=center| 1
| align=center| 1:58
| Topeka, Kansas, United States
| 
|-
|  Loss
| align=center| 2–1
| Victor Moreno
| TKO (punches)
| MCC 2: Midwest Xplosion
| 
| align=center| 1
| align=center| 0:08
| Des Moines, Iowa, United States
| 
|-
|  Win
| align=center| 2–0
| Kyle Bradley
| KO (punch)
| Titan FC 1
| 
| align=center| 1
| align=center| 4:47
| Kansas City, Kansas, United States
| 
|-
|  Win
| align=center| 1–0
| Demi Deeds
| TKO (punches)
| Midwest Cage Championships 1
| 
| align=center| 2
| align=center| 1:11
| Des Moines, Iowa, United States
|

References

External links
 
 

1979 births
American male mixed martial artists
Living people
Welterweight mixed martial artists
Mixed martial artists utilizing boxing
Mixed martial artists from Kansas
Ultimate Fighting Championship male fighters